The 2016 San Diego City Attorney election occurred on Tuesday, November 8, 2016. The primary election was held on Tuesday, June 7, 2016.

Municipal elections in California are officially non-partisan, although most members do identify a party preference. A two-round system was used for the election, starting with a primary in June followed by a runoff in November between the top-two candidates.

Campaign
The incumbent City Attorney Jan Goldsmith, was ineligible to run for reelection after eight years in the position due to term limits. Four Democrats and one Republican contested the race.

In the June primary, Republican Robert Hickey and Democrat Mara Elliott received the most votes and advanced to the November runoff election. Elliott's second-place victory in the June primary was considered an upset due to her opponents out raising and out spending her. Unlike her opponents, Elliott did not receive many of the typical endorsements from the various local democratic groups.

In the November runoff, Elliott defeated Hickey by a margin of 57 to 42 and was elected City Attorney.

Results

References 

San Diego City Attorney
San Diego City Attorney elections